Scheibenberg is a mountain of Saxony, southeastern Germany.

References
 Johannes Baier (2021): Abraham Gottlob Werner und der Scheibenberg (Erzgebirge). - Aufschluss 72(4), 177–185.
 Johannes Baier & Peter Suhr (2021): Die Basaltsäulen vom Scheibenberg und Hirtstein im Erzgebirge. - Fossilien, 38(5): 36–43.

Mountains of Saxony
Mountains of the Ore Mountains
Protected landscapes in Germany